Brittny is a feminine given name, similar to Brittany and Britney.

List of people with the given name 

 Brittny Anderson, Canadian politician
 Brittny Gastineau (born 1982), American model, socialite, and reality television personality
 Brittny Ward, American model

Feminine given names